Samir Banerjee (born October 2, 2003) is an American tennis player.

Banerjee has a career high ITF junior combined ranking of No. 2 achieved on 12 July 2021.

He won the 2021 Junior Wimbledon title and was seeded No. 2 at the 2021 US Open Juniors where he reached the quarterfinals.

Personal life
Banerjee reportedly started playing tennis at the age of 6.

Banarjee attended Ridge High School and reached the NJSIAA singles semifinals in his freshman season.

Banerjee was admitted at Stanford University starting 2022.

Junior Grand Slam finals

Singles: 1 (1 title)

References

External links

2003 births
Living people
American people of Bengali descent
American male tennis players
American sportspeople of Indian descent
Indian-American tennis players
Wimbledon junior champions
Stanford Cardinal men's tennis players
Grand Slam (tennis) champions in boys' singles